Christian Frederick Matthaei (4 March 1744, in Mücheln – 26 September 1811), a Thuringian, palaeographer, classical philologist, professor first at Wittenberg and then at Moscow.

Life 
He was rector of the University of Halle-Wittenberg. In 1803 he was appointed to the Professorship of Classical Literature at Moscow University. In Moscow he found a large number of Greek manuscripts, both Biblical and Patristic, originally brought from Athos, quite uncollated, and almost entirely unknown in the West Europe. He collated seventy manuscripts of the New Testament. He also gave a big collection of biblical citations in the writings of Chrysostom. He issued at Riga in 12 parts, between 1782 and 1788, an edition of the Greek text with the Latin Vulgate. His printed text is of little value because it is based on manuscripts of recent date, but his apparatus is valuable.

Matthaei managed to steal a good many manuscripts of both the classics and the fathers. Some of these he kept in his own library, while others he sold to the libraries in Germany (Dresden) and Holland.

Works 

 Βικτωρος Πρεσβυτερου ̓Αντιοχειας Και ̓αλλων Τινων ̔αγιων Πατερων ̓Εξηγησις Ἐις Το Κατα Μαρκον ̔αγιον Ἐυαγγελιον. Ex Codicibus Mosquensibus Edidit Christianus Fridericus Matthaei. ; t. 2 : Adiecta Est Huic Volumini Praeter Recensionem Codicum Et Varias Lectiones...), 2 vol. (Moscou, 1775).
 Lectiones Mosquenses (Leipzig 1779).
 D. Pavli Epistolae ad Thessalonicenses et Ad Timotheum Graece et Latine (1782-1785).
 D. Pauli Epistola I. et II. ad Corinthios, Graece et Latine (1783).
 Joannis Apocalypsis Graece et Latine (1785).
 Vetustum ecclesiae Graecae, Constantinopolitanae, ut videtur, Evangeliarum bibliothecae Serenissimi Ducis Saxo-Gothani. / Nunc primo totum ad cognoscendam liturgiam Graecorum accuratius examinavit et adjectis variantibus sacri contextus lectionibus edidit. Breitkopf, Leipzig, 1791.
 XIII epistolarum Pauli codex Graecus cum versione latina veteri vulgo Antehieronymiana olim Boernerianus nunc bibliothecae electoralis Dresdensis, Meissen, 1791.
 Novum Testamentum Graece et Latine (Riga, 1782-1788).
 Novum Testamentum Graece. Wittenberg 1803. tomus 1

References

Further reading 
 Karl Heinrich Dzondi (Schundenius): Erinnerungen an die festlichen Tage der dritten Stiftungsfeier der Akademie zu Wittenberg. S. 89
 Neues Wittenberger Wochenblatt. 1803 S. 261
 Nikolaus Müller: Die Funde in den Turmknäufen der Stadtkirche zu Wittenberg. Evangelische Buchhandlung Ernst Holtermann, Magdeburg, 1912
 Oskar Leopold von Gebhardt: Christian Friedrich Matthaei und seine Sammlung griechischer Handschriften. In: Zentralblatt für Bibliothekswesen. O. Harrassowitz Verlag, Leipzig, 1898, S. 345
 Heinrich Johann Michael Doering: Die gelehrten Theologen Deutschlands. 4. Bd., Neustadt an der Orla 1831-35
 Walter Friedensburg: Geschichte der Universität Wittenberg. Verlag Max Niemeyer Halle (Saale) 1917
 Heinz Kathe: Die Wittenberger Philosophische Fakultät 1502 – 1817. Böhlau Verlag, 2002, 
 Белокуров С.А. О греческих рукописях Московских библиотек, похищенных проф. Маттеи. // Временник Общества истории и древностей Российских. Кн. 2. — 1899. — № 189.

External links 

 
 Werkauswahl Uni Jena
 Marinus Antony Wes, Classics in Russia 1700-1855: between two bronze horsemen, Brill 1992, pp. 76 ff.

1744 births
1811 deaths
People from Saalekreis
German scholars
German classical philologists
German emigrants to the Russian Empire